L'Éphémère was a French poetry magazine published from 1967 to 1972 in Paris, France. The magazine was founded and edited by poets Yves Bonnefoy, Louis-René Des Forêts, Jacques Dupin and André Du Bouchet. It was established to react to new literary waves in the country, which ignored the privileged status of poetry. The financier of the magazine, which was published quarterly, was Galerie Maeght.

References

Further reading
Alain Mascarou, Les Cahiers de "L'Éphémère", 1967-1972, L'Harmattan, 1998

1967 establishments in France
1972 disestablishments in France
Defunct literary magazines published in France
French poetry
Magazines established in 1967
Magazines disestablished in 1972
Magazines published in Paris
Poetry literary magazines
Quarterly magazines published in France